The District of Columbia Fire and Emergency Medical Services Department (also known as DC FEMS, FEMS, DCFD, DC Fire, or DC Fire & EMS), established July 1, 1804, provides fire protection and emergency medical service for the District of Columbia, in the United States. An organ of the devolved district government, Fire & EMS is responsible for providing fire suppression, ambulance service and hazardous materials containment for the federal district.

History

On January 13, 1803, District of Columbia passed its first law about fire control, requiring the owner of each building in the district to provide at least one leather firefighting bucket per story or pay a $1 fine per missing bucket.

The first firefighting organizations in the district were private volunteer companies. To end the problems created by rivalries between these companies, District of Columbia approved in 1864 an act to consolidate them and organize a paid fire department. Seven years passed before it was implemented on September 23, 1871, creating the all-professional District of Columbia Fire Department (DCFD) with a combination of paid and volunteer staff. The department had seven paid firefighters and 13 call men to answer alarms, manning three engines and two ladders.

By 1900, the DCFD had grown to 14 engine companies, four ladder companies, and two chemical companies.

In 1968, the entire DCFD was mobilized during the riots that followed the assassination of Martin Luther King Jr. The four days of disorder saw widespread civil unrest, looting and arson, which ultimately required help with 70 outside companies to battle over 500 fires and perform 120 rescues.

In the 1970s and 1980s, the department was rife with racial tension, as the nearly all-white department became much more racially integrated and African Americans sought upper-level supervisory and management positions.

2010s budget and maintenance problems

In January 2010, The Washington Examiner reported that, in a major management failure, the agency failed to budget for seniority pay in its fiscal 2010 budget, causing a $2 million shortfall. After a hiring freeze left 130 positions unfilled, the department was projected to spend $15.4 million in fiscal 2010 (2.5 times the budgeted amount). More than 75 percent of the agency's budget goes to salaries and fringe benefits.

Problems with vehicle maintenance also worsened after 2010. The department lost track of the location of reserve vehicles, and sometimes listed fire engines as available for duty when they had been stripped for parts and sent to the junkyard. In 2012, the agency hired a consultant at a cost of $182,000 to create an accurate database of vehicle status and location. Both the D.C. Council and the District of Columbia's inspector general have strongly criticized the department's record. The District of Columbia Firefighters Association, Local 36, and the International Association of Firefighters (IAFF) have argued that the problem lies with poor management, while DCFEMS has said the problems either cannot be accounted for or are the result of rank-and-file incompetence or neglect.

In July 2013, more than 60 DCFEMS ambulances were out of commission due to maintenance issues, and the department was forced to hire a private ambulance service to provide staffing at a Major League Baseball game. On August 8, 2013, a DCFEMS ambulance ran out of fuel while part of President Barack Obama's motorcade, and ended up stranded on the South Lawn of the White House (EMS personnel said they reported a broken fuel gauge months ago, while DCFEMS said workers failed to fill the vehicle with gasoline.) On August 13, 2013, two DCFEMS ambulances caught fire—one while delivering a patient to MedStar Washington Hospital Center, the other while responding to an emergency call at an apartment building on Benning Road SE (another ambulance was dispatched to take the patient to the hospital.)

In June 2015, Jullette M. Saussy was named the medical director of DC Fire and EMS. On January 29, 2016, she announced her resignation from that position in a letter to Mayor Muriel Bowser. In her letter, she called the department's culture "highly toxic to the delivery of any semblance of quality pre-hospital medical care."

Stations and apparatus 

, these are the DCFD's stations and equipment.

See also

 Government of the District of Columbia
 Fireboat John H. Glenn Jr.
 Benjamin C. Grenup Monument built to honor the first D.C. firefighter killed in action

References

External links

Flickr Group

 
Fire
Organizations established in 1804
1804 establishments in Washington, D.C.